Dogu may refer to:

Dogū, Japanese traditional figurines of the late Jōmon period
Dogu, a Japanese term meaning "the instruments of the way" very roughly approximating the concept "tools of the trade"; most commonly used in English to refer to martial arts gear
Doğu, a Turkish name
 Yaşar Doğu (1913–1961), champion sports wrestler
 Doğu Perinçek (born 1942), Turkish politician
 Sinem Doğu (born 1987), Turkish female ice hockey player and trainer
 Ersan Dogu (born 1972), Turkish football player
 Doğubeyazıt
 , a Turkish passenger ship requisitioned by Germany on completion in 1939